Phyllodesma is a Holarctic genus of moths in the family Lasiocampidae. The genus was first described by Jacob Hübner in 1820.

Species
Phyllodesma ilicifolia
Phyllodesma japonicum
Phyllodesma tremulifolium
Phyllodesma kermesifolium
Phyllodesma suberifolium
Phyllodesma priapus
Phyllodesma ambigua
Phyllodesma alice
Phyllodesma hyssarum
Phyllodesma joannisi
Phyllodesma jurii
Phyllodesma mongolicum
Phyllodesma griseum
Phyllodesma sinina
Phyllodesma occidentis
Phyllodesma americana
Phyllodesma coturnix

References

External links

Lasiocampidae
Taxonomy articles created by Polbot